The 2013 Richmond Kickers season was the soccer club's twenty-first season of existence. It was the Kickers' seventh-consecutive year in the third-tier of American soccer, playing in the USL Professional Division for their third season. The Kickers finished the season atop the USL Pro table, but lost in the playoff semifinals.

Competitions

Preseason

USL Pro

Overall standings

Match results

USL Pro Playoffs

U.S. Open Cup

Statistics

Appearances and goals

|}

Transfers

In

Out

Loan in

Loan out

References 

2013 USL Pro season
2013
American soccer clubs 2013 season
2013 in sports in Virginia